Alaçardırlı (also, Alaçadırlı and Alachadyrly) is a village and municipality in the Barda Rayon of Azerbaijan.  It has a population of 1,379.

References 

Populated places in Barda District